The National Council of Asian Pacific Americans (NCAPA) is a coalition of 35 national Asian-Pacific American organizations in the United States. Founded in 1996 and based in Washington D.C., NCAPA seeks to expand the influence of Asian-Pacific Americans in the legislative and legal arenas, and enhance the public's and mass media's awareness and sensitivity to Asian-Pacific American concerns.

Executive committee
The NCAPA executive committee is constituted by executive directors of member organizations.

The current executive committee is as follows:
 Quyen Dinh, chair, Southeast Asia Resource Action Center (SEARAC)
 Kathy Ko Chin, Asian & Pacific Islander American Health Forum (APIAHF)
 Michelle Kauhane, Council for Native Hawaiian Advancement (CNHA)

Past chairs include:
 Gregory Cendana, former executive director, Asian Pacific American Labor Alliance 
 Deepa Iyer, former executive director, South Asian Americans Leading Together 
 Floyd Mori, president & CEO, Asian Pacific American Institute for Congressional Studies 
 Lisa Hasegawa, executive director, National Coalition of Asian Pacific American Community Development
 Karen Narasaki, executive director of Asian American Justice Center
 Daphne Kwok, founding NCAPA chair and former executive director of OCA; Daphne Kwok is also the current chair to the President's Advisory Council on Asian American Pacific Islanders

Members
NCAPA coalition members work together on various policy issues such as Civil & Human Rights, Education, Health, Housing & Economic Justice, and Immigration. Each of these policy issues has a committee which meets on a regular basis focusing on the key issues of the moment to ensure that the AA & NHPI voice is heard and at the table regarding these matters.

The coalition members are as follows: 
 Asian & Pacific Islander American Health Forum | APIAHF 
 Asian & Pacific Islander American Vote | APIAVote 
 Asian Americans Advancing Justice | AAJC 
 Asian Pacific American Labor Alliance, AFL-CIO | APALA 
 Asian Pacific Partners for Empowerment, Advocacy, and Leadership | APPEAL 
 Association of Asian Pacific Community Health Organizations | AAPCHO 
 Boat People SOS 
 Council for Native Hawaiian Advancement | CNHA
 Hmong National Development, Inc. | HND 
 Japanese American Citizens League | JACL 
 Laotian American National Alliance | LANA 
 National Asian American Pacific Islander Mental Health Association | NAAPIMHA 
 National Asian Pacific American Bar Association | NAPABA 
 National Asian Pacific American Families Against Substance Abuse | NAPAFASA 
 National Asian Pacific American Women's Forum | NAPAWF 
 National Asian Pacific Center on Aging | NAPCA 
 National Coalition for Asian Pacific American Community Development | NCAPACD 
 National Council of Asian Pacific Islander Physicians | NCAPIP 
 National Korean American Service & Education Consortium | NAKASEC 
 National Queer Asian Pacific Islander Alliance | NQAPIA 
 Organization of Chinese Americans - Asian Pacific American Advocates | OCA 
 Sikh American Legal Defense and Education Fund | SALDEF 
 South Asian Americans Leading Together | SAALT 
 South Asian Bar Association of North America | SABA 
 Southeast Asia Resource Action Center | SEARAC

Additional affiliate members include: 
 Asian & Pacific Islander American Scholarship Fund | APIASF 
 Asian American Psychological Association | AAPA 
 Asian Pacific American Institute for Congressional Studies | APAICS 
 Center for Asian American Media | CAAM 
 Center for Asian Pacific American Women | CAPAW 
 Leadership Education for Asian Pacifics | LEAP 
 National Association of Asian American Professionals | NAAAP 
 National Federation of Filipino American Associations | NaFFAA 
 National Japanese American Memorial Foundation | NJAMF

History
The 1990s saw significant growth in the number and size of Asian-Pacific American (APA) organizations. Nevertheless, many of these organizations spoke for only a segment of the broader community. The push to create an organization gained additional impetus after the 1996 United States campaign finance controversy, in which Asian-Pacific Americans played a significant role. At the July 1996 Organization of Chinese Americans convention in Chicago, Illinois, the leaders of several APA organizations agreed that there was a need for an advocacy coalition which would bring together APA organizations on the local, state, regional and national levels. Former U.S. Representative Norman Mineta assisted the group in convening a series of meetings to discuss the new organization's mission and functions.

NCAPA was formally constituted in 1997. Daphne Kwok of the Organization of Chinese Americans was elected the organization's first chairperson.

NCAPA has been primarily active in politics.  In 2000, the group strongly criticized Senator John McCain for using the "gooks" to describe his North Vietnamese prison guards. Four years later, NCAPA took a more proactive role by issuing a first-of-its-kind political platform addressing APA issues, and asking presidential candidates to adopt the platform as their own.

In 2007, after the Virginia Tech massacre, NCAPA worked to counteract discrimination against Asian-Pacific Americans and negative images of APAs in the national media.

On May 8, 2013, members of the coalition met with President Obama and senior staff to discuss topics of immigration, health care, and civil rights. Much of the conversation centered on the comprehensive immigration reform starting to make its way through Congress. In particular, the AAPI leaders zeroed on family reunification measures that are critical to immigrant communities. Participants included Asian American leaders from APALA, APIAHF, CNHA, NCAPACD, OCA, AAPCHO, NCAPA, SAALT, APAICS, AAJC, JACL, SEARAC, NAPAWF, and NAKASEC.

References

Further reading
Basu, Kaustuv. "Va. Tech Massacre Casts Pall of Hatred, Suspicion." Florida Today. April 28, 2007.
Gersham, John.  "Still the Pacific Century? U.S. Policy in Asia and the Pacific." In "Global Focus."  Martha Honey and Tom Barry, eds.  New York: St. Martin's Press, 2000. 
"In the Thick of Things." Asian Week. December 25, 1997 – January 7, 1998.
Kong, Deborah. "Asian Americans Work to Raise Political Voices." Honolulu Star-Bulletin. February 13, 2004.
"McCain Under Fire for Racial Slur." Associated Press. March 1, 2000.
Nash, Phil Tajitsu. "State of Politics--1998." Asian Week. May 21, 1998.
Paget-Clarke, Nic. "28 Asian Pacific American organizations file support for affirmative action at the U. S. Supreme Court." In Motion Magazine. April 1, 2003.

External links
National Council of Asian Pacific Americans Web site

1997 establishments in Washington, D.C.
Asian-American organizations
Asian-American issues
Organizations based in Washington, D.C.
United States–Asian relations
United States–Oceanian relations
Organizations established in 1997
Pacific Islands American history